Come Out Fighting is a 1945 American film directed by William Beaudine. It was the last in the Monogram Pictures series of "East Side Kids" films before the series was reinvented as "The Bowery Boys.  Film critic Leonard Maltin described the film as "grating," giving it one and a half out of four stars.

Plot
The East Side Kids are ejected from their clubhouse in a raid brought on by complaining neighbors, they have no place to train for an upcoming boxing tournament. The police commissioner is worried that his son Gilbert, who prefers ballet to boxing, is turning out to be a wimp, so he offers the gang a deal: he'll lay off them if they will take his son in their gang and toughen the boy up. Gang member Muggs McGinnis takes an instant dislike to Gilbert, and sets Gilbert up to get in a fight with Danny More, the gang's best boxer, but is impressed when he sees Gilbert use ballet moves to avoid getting hit, and instead knock out Danny. Later, the East Side Kids learn that Gilbert's girlfriend Rita has taken Gilbert to an illegal casino owned by local gangsters. The East Side Kids get to the casino just before cops raid the place. Muggs is able to sneak Gilbert out, but Danny is injured, and Muggs himself is caught, and is therefore barred from entering the boxing tournament. Gilbert agrees to participate in the tournament, and is in bad shape after the first two rounds. Muggs advises Gilbert to use his ballet moves, which enables Gilbert to win the match. Gilbert then confesses the truth about having been at the casino, and his police commissioner father clears Muggs of all charges.

Cast

The East Side Kids
 Leo Gorcey as Mugs McGinnis
 Huntz Hall as Glimpy
 Billy Benedict as Skinny
 Gabriel Dell as Talman (a.k.a. Pete)
 Mende Koenig as Danny
 Buddy Gorman as Sammy

Remaining cast
 June Carlson as Jane Riley
 Amelita Ward as Rita Joyce
 Addison Richards as Police Commissioner James Mitchell
 George Meeker as Silk Henry
 Johnny Duncan as Gilbert Mitchell
 Fred Kelsey as Mr. McGinnis, Sr.
 Douglas Wood as Mayor
 Milton Kibbee as Police chief
 Pat Gleason as Little Pete Vargas
 Robert Homans as Police Sergeant Tom Riley
 Patsy Moran as Mrs. McGinnis
 Alan Foster as Whitey
 Davison Clark as Officer McGowan
 Meyer Grace as Jake
 Betty Sinclair as Stenographer

References

External links

1945 films
1945 comedy films
1940s English-language films
American black-and-white films
Monogram Pictures films
Films directed by William Beaudine
American comedy films
Films produced by Sam Katzman
American boxing films
East Side Kids
1940s American films